Jean Déré (23 June 1886 – 6 December 1970) was a French music educator and composer.

Life 
Born in Niort, Déré was introduced to classical music by his father, who was organist and choir director in Niort, and performed in public at the age of six. From 1897 he studied at the Conservatoire de Paris, where he was a student of Louis Diémer, Albert Lavignac, Georges Caussade, Charles Lenepveu, Jules Massenet and Charles Marie Widor.

Already in the time of the First World War he developed his first compositions, among them a symphonic poem and an opera. During this time he also taught in Niort and temporarily represented Widor as organist at The Great Organ of Église Saint-Sulpice de Paris, where he also met Albert Schweitzer several times.

As the competition and the Prix de Rome were suspended during the war, Déré had already clearly exceeded the maximum age of thirty years laid down in the rules when he participated in 1919. He won the "Second Grand Prix" with the cantata Le Poéte et la Fée.

He then taught counterpoint at the Conservatoire de Paris before becoming professor of solfège and harmony from 1937 to 1956. In 1933 he became one of the pioneers in the broadcasting of great classical concerts with Désiré-Émile Inghelbrecht, Élisabeth Brasseur and Igor Stravinsky. He was Jacques Loussier's teacher.

He is the author of pieces for piano, violin, orchestra and an opera Le Mirage. He is also author of film music, in particular Kœnigsmark (1923).

He remained active as a composer and wrote numerous church music works in addition to orchestral and choral works and chamber music.

Déré died in Sainte-Suzanne, Mayenne at age 84.

Works 
 Sonate for piano and violin
 Trio for piano, violin and cello
 Poème de la mer, symphonic poem in three parts
 Au seuil des arènes, Opera in three acts
 Esquisses sketches, ten pieces for orchestra
 Krishna, symphonic poem
 Trois Esquisses for piano and orchestra
 Stage music for Faustus by Christopher Marlowe
 Andante et Scherzo for clarinet and piano
 Suite brève et disparate for cello and piano
 Chant héroïque for cello and piano
 Deux sonates and Trois sonatines for violin and piano
 Trois sonatines for piano
 A la campagne for piano
 Trois marines for piano
 Trois danses anciennes for piano
 Chants arabes after 
 Les Saintes du Paradis, song cycle after Rémy de Gourmont
 Jeux et chansons à la mode de chez nous
 Cinq Repons pour les funérailles : Libera me, Domine, Subvenite, In paradisum, Credo quod Redemptor and Qui Lazarum.

External links 

1886 births
1970 deaths
20th-century French composers
20th-century French male musicians
French classical composers
French male classical composers
French music educators
Academic staff of the Conservatoire de Paris
Conservatoire de Paris alumni
Prix de Rome for composition
Chevaliers of the Légion d'honneur
People from Niort